The Swiss Confederation is the official name of Switzerland.

Swiss Confederation may also refer to:
Swiss Confederation (Napoleonic), between 1803 and 1815

See also
Chronicle of the Swiss Confederation, the oldest printed chronicle of Switzerland
Eidgenossenschaft, the German term
Old Swiss Confederacy, the precursor of modern-day Switzerland